ARFB, ArfB or 'arfB may refer to:

Biochemistry
 2-amino-5-formylamino-6-ribosylaminopyrimidin-4(3H)-one 5'-monophosphate deformylase, an enzyme
 Alternative ribosome-rescue factor B - ArfB, a protein that helps rescue stalled ribosomes.
 arfB the gene for ArfB.

Organisations
 Arkansas Farm Bureau Federation, a non-profit organization
 , a non-profit organization